The 2001–02 Highland Football League was won by Fraserburgh. Rothes finished bottom. Inverurie Loco Works joined the Highland League this season, increasing the number of teams from 14 to 15.

Table

Highland Football League seasons
5
Scot